The 2009 FIM Speedway World Championship Grand Prix of Great Britain was the fifth race of the 2009 Speedway Grand Prix season. It took place on 27 June 2009 in the Millennium Stadium in Cardiff, Great Britain.

The British Grand Prix was won by GP leader Jason Crump who beat Fredrik Lindgren, Hans Andersen and Greg Hancock in the final. Crump won with a 24-point maximum score and it was his third Grand Prix win of the season.

Riders 

One wild card and two track reserves were nominated by the Auto-Cycle Union. Edward Kennett was selected as the wild card after finishing second behind Chris Harris at the 2009 British Speedway Championship. Tai Woffinden and Simon Stead will be the track reserves. The riders' starting positions draw for Grand Prix meeting was made on 26 June at 12:00 CET and it was carried out
by Jury President Christer Bergström and Miss Wales Chloe-Beth Morgan.

Heat details

Heat after heat 
 Bjerre, Pedersen, Sayfutdinov, Holta (F4x) Holta crashes on 2nd lap. Holta excluded. 
 Andersen, Hancock, Lindgren, Nicholls
 Ułamek, Jonsson, Kennett, Gollob
 Crump, Harris, Adams, Walasek
 Ułamek, Harris, Nicholls, Sayfutdinov
 Lindgren, Pedersen, Walasek, Jonsson (e4)
 Crump, Hancock, Gollob, Bjerre
 Andersen, Kennett, Holta, Adams
 Lindgren, Gollob, Sayfutdinov, Adams
 Crump, Pedersen, Nicholls, Kennett
 Andersen, Bjerre, Ułamek, Walasek (e3)
 Holta, Hancock, Jonsson, Harris
 Sayfutdinov, Hancock, Kennett, Walasek
 Gollob, Harris, Andersen, Pedersen
 Nicholls, Jonsson, Adams, Bjerre
 Crump, Lindgren, Ułamek, Holta (F3x) Holta crashes. Holta excluded. 
 Crump, Sayfutdinov, Andersen, Jonsson (X) Crump crashes on first lap. Jonsson excluded.
 Hancock, Pedersen, Adams, Ułamek
 Harris, Bjerre, Lindgren, Kennett
 Holta, Gollob, Nicholls, Walasek
 Semi-Finals:
 Crump, Lindgren, Gollob, Ułamek
 Hancock, Andersen, Pedersen (Fx), Harris (X) Andersen crashes on 1st lap. Harris excluded. Nicki Pedersen crashes on 1st lap - race stopped again. Pedersen excluded. 
 The Final:
 Crump, Lindgren, Andersen, Hancock

The intermediate classification

See also 
 Speedway Grand Prix
 List of Speedway Grand Prix riders

References

External links 
 FIM-live.com

Great Britain
2009
Speedway Grand Prix of Great Britain 2009
Speedway Grand Prix
Speedway Grand Prix
2000s in Cardiff